Yiwu Wetland is a wetland in Kouhu Township, Yunlin County, Taiwan.>

History
The wetland was originally a sugarcane farm owned by Taiwan Sugar Corporation. But due to a typhoon which struck the region, it caused seawater intrusion and the wetland was created.

Geology
The wetland spans over an area of 1,857 hectares. It consists of two ponds, the north pond and the south pond, which also acts as fish pond. It also features a cycling path, several observation decks and pavilions. The Baigung River, Jienshan Ditch and Niausong Ditch pass through the wetland.

Transportation
The wetland is accessible by bus from Chiayi Station of Taiwan High Speed Rail.

See also
 List of tourist attractions in Taiwan

References

Landforms of Yunlin County
Wetlands of Taiwan
Tourist attractions in Yunlin County